The 2014 Hockey India League (known as the Hero Hockey India League for sponsorship reasons), abbreviated as HIL 2014, is the second season of the professional field hockey tournament, Hockey India League. The tournament begun on 25 January 2014 with the final on 23 February 2014.

The season will see the addition of one new franchise, Kalinga Lancers, making a total of six franchises in the league.
Delhi Waveriders won this year title after finishing the second last year.

Teams

Players' auction

A mini-auction was held on 22 November 2013, featuring nearly 154 players from India and around the world, out of which 49 were bought. The base prices for the players varied from USD 2,600 to USD 25,000.

League progression

Results

Note: Click on the results to see match summary.

Schedule
All matches' timings according to Indian Standard Time (UTC +5:30)

League Phase

First to fourth place classification

Semifinals

Third and fourth place

Final

Awards

Statistics

Leading Goal Scorers

Hat-tricks

Clean sheets

Player

Scoring
First goal of the season: Talwinder Singh for Delhi Waveriders against Punjab Warriors (25 January 2014)
Last goal of the season: Yuvraj Walmiki for Delhi Waveriders against Punjab Warriors  (23 February 2014)
Largest winning margin: 5 goals
Delhi Waveriders 5–0 Kalinga Lancers (30 January 2014)
Highest scoring game: 10 goals
Kalinga Lancers 3–7 Punjab Warriors (28 January 2014)
Most goals scored in a match by a single team: 7 goals
Kalinga Lancers 3–7 Punjab Warriors (28 January 2014)
Most goals scored in a match by a losing team: 3 goals
Punjab Warriors 5–3 Mumbai Magicians (26 January 2014)
Kalinga Lancers 3–7 Punjab Warriors (28 January 2014)
Mumbai Magicians 3–5 Uttar Pradesh Wizards (29 January 2014)
Kalinga Lancers 3–4 Delhi Waveriders (2 February 2014)
Uttar Pradesh Wizards 3–4 Delhi Waveriders (8 February 2014)
Kalinga Lancers 3–4 Uttar Pradesh Wizards (13 February 2014)
Mumbai Magicians 3–5 Delhi Waveriders (15 February 2014)

Team
Most clean sheets: 3
Delhi Waveriders
Fewest clean sheets: 0
Kalinga Lancers
Mumbai Magicians
Punjab Warriors
Uttar Pradesh Wizards

Discipline
Only green and yellow cards were awarded by umpires during the course of the league.

Player
Most Green cards:  04
V. R. Raghunath (Uttar Pradesh Wizards)
Most Yellow cards: 02
Mohammed Amir Khan (Kalinga Lancers)
Lloyd Norris-Jones (Delhi Wave Riders)
Tristan White (Delhi Wave Riders)

Team
Green cards: 
Punjab Warriors: 16
Kalinga Lancers: 11
Mumbai Magicians: 10 
Uttar Pradesh Wizards: 10
Delhi Wave Riders: 9
Ranchi Rhinos: 8
Yellow cards: 
Delhi Wave Riders: 7
Punjab Warriors: 6
Uttar Pradesh Wizards: 5
Ranchi Rhinos: 4
Kalinga Lancers: 3
Mumbai Magicians: 3

Source:

See also
 List of Hockey India League players
 World Series Hockey

References

External links
 Official Website

  
Hockey India League seasons
India
Hockey